Ridgway is both a given name and an English surname. Notable people with the name include:

Ridgway Robert Syers Christian Codner Lloyd (1842–1884), English physician and antiquary
Dave Ridgway (born 1959), British-Canadian football player
Eldo T. Ridgway (1880–1955), American politician and physician
Ellen Richards Ridgway (1866–1934), American golfer
Fred Ridgway (1923–2015), English cricketer
Gary Ridgway (born 1949), American serial killer known as the Green River Killer
Jesse Ridgway (born 1992) American YouTuber
John Ridgway (comic artist) (born 1940), British comics artist
John Ridgway (sailor) (born 1938), British sailor
John Livzey Ridgway (1859–1947), American scientific illustrator 
Keith Ridgway (born 1965), Irish author
Linda Ridgway (born 1947), American artist
Matthew Ridgway (1895–1993), American military general
Peter Ridgway (pentathlete) (born 1949), American pentathlete
Robert Ridgway (1850–1929), American ornithologist
Robert Ridgway (congressman) (1823-1870), American congressman from Virginia
Stan Ridgway (born 1954), American musician
Thomas Ridgway (19th century), British trader
Thomas S. Ridgway (1826–1897), American politician and businessman

See also
Ridgeway (surname)

English-language surnames